Marcello Abbado (7 October 19264 June 2020) was an Italian pianist, composer, conductor and academic teacher. His compositions include several orchestral works, two ballets, numerous pieces for solo piano, and chamber music. As a pianist, he played in major concert halls of the world. He taught composition at several conservatories, ultimately at the Giuseppe Verdi Conservatory. In 1989 he was awarded the Gold Medal for Meritorious Culture and Art (Medaglia d'oro ai benemeriti della cultura e dell'arte) by the Government of Italy.

Early life and education
Born in Milan into a family of famous musicians, he was the son of violinist , brother of conductor Claudio Abbado, and father of conductor Roberto Abbado and digital artist Adriano Abbado. He studied piano at the Giuseppe Verdi Conservatory with Gianandrea Gavazzeni and Renzo Lorenzoni, graduating in 1944. He further studied composition with Giulio Cesare Paribèni and Giorgio Federico Ghedini, earning the diploma in 1947.

Career 
As a pianist, his repertoire included Mozart's 27 piano concertos, played with the Vienna Philharmonic, and Debussy's entire piano works. He also performed keyboard music by J. S. Bach and Alessandro Scarlatti, and piano concertos, including those by Tchaikovsky and Prokofiev and Ravel's Concerto for the Left Hand. He performed in the major halls of Beijing, Budapest, Buenos Aires, London, Milan, Montreal, Moscow, New York, Paris, Rome, Tokyo and Vienna.

In addition to concert activity, Abbado was also a teacher of musical composition at the Conservatory of Bologna for twelve years, also in Parma and Piacenza. He later served as the director of the Giuseppe Nicolini Conservatory in Piacenza (1958 to 1966), at the Conservatory "Gioacchino Rossini" in Pesaro (1966 to 1972) and finally at the Giuseppe Verdi Conservatory in Milan (1972 to 1996). He was also a member of the board at the Teatro alla Scala for twenty-four years. In 1993, together with Vladimir Delman, he formed the Symphonic Orchestra of Milan "Giuseppe Verdi", of which he was the artistic director from 1993 to 1996. He also taught masterclasses in Asia, Europe and the United States.

His numerous compositions have been published by leading Italian publishers, including Carish, Curci, Ricordi and Suvini Zerboni. Programs dedicated exclusively to his music have been performed in Japan, Russia and the United States.

Abbado was the president and a jury member of international music competitions, including the Beethoven Competition in Vienna, Bösendorfer in Brussels, Maria Canals International Music Competition in Barcelona, Ciani in Milan, Min-On in Tokyo, Obraztosva in Saint Petersburg, Rubinstein in Tel Aviv, and Van Cliburn International Piano Competition in Fort Worth, among many others.

Death 
Abbado died in Stresa at age 93.

Compositions 
Abbado's compositions include ballets, vocal music for choirs and solo voices, orchestral works and chamber music, often including the piano:

 Ciapo for voice and nine instruments
 Duo for violin and cello (1952)
 Scena senza storia, ballet (1954)
 15 Poesie T'ang for voice, flute, oboe, cello and piano (1959)
 Ostinato sopra un ritmo dalla Sinfonia del Signor Bruschino di Rossini for piano, strings and percussion (1994)
 Sette Ricercari e Sei Intermezzi for violin and orchestra (1996)
 L'idea fissa for violin, choir and thirteen voices (1996)
 Musica celeste (1997)
 Dieci canti popolari siciliani for violin, voice and orchestra (1997)
 Le campane di Mosca for violin and percussion (1998)
 Hawaii 2000
 Lento e Rondò for violin and percussion orchestra (2000)
 Costruzione for twelve cellos (2001)
 Variazioni sopra un tema di Mozart for orchestra (2001)
 Nuova Costruzione for eight woodwinds (2002)
 Concerto per flauto e orchestra (2002)
 Australia for violin, didgeridoo, piano and percussion (2002)
 Asif, Saleem, Nasreen for violin, viola, cello and strings (2002)
 Risonanza magnetica for piano and percussion (2003)
 Stage music for La voix humaine by Jean Cocteau (2003)
 Il buio negli occhi (2003)
 La strage degli innocenti, cantata for solo voice, boys' choir, mixed choir and orchestra
 Concerto for orchestra
 Hommage à C. Debussy for orchestra
 Doppio concerto for violin, piano and double chamber orchestra
 Quadruplo concerto for piano, violin, viola, cello and orchestra
 Concerto for harp and string quartet (2003-2004)
 Concerto per carillon e orchestra (2005)
 Tankstream, for string quartet (2005)
 Fantasia russa for violin and string quartet (2005)
 Sinfonia degli arrivi (2006)
 Carillon su Joyce Yang for piano and percussion (2006)
 Quattro Viola Fantasie for oboe, trumpet, piano and vibraphone (2006)
 Kazach Fantasy for violin and orchestra Kazach (2006)
 Bali for violin and Indonesian gamelan (2006)
 Costruzioni... e Ricostruzioni 2007
 Mondrian trio, piano trio (2007)
 Carillon on Min-On for piano four-hands (2008)
 Van Cliburn Concerto for four pianos and orchestra (2008)
 Java for percussion (2008)
 Concerto for four violins and strings (2008)
 Dialogo a due voci for the left hand (2009)
 Per due orchestre (2009)
 Gloria per Gloria for soprano, choir and orchestra (2009)
 Stagioni for violin and reciter (2009)
 Alicante for sixteen horns, sixteen trumpets, sixteen trombones (2010)
 Sogno for orchestra (2010)
 Asia for percussion, voice recordings and Asian instruments  (2010)
 Dialogo for harp and trumpet (2011)
 Sitkovetsky Wu for violin and piano (2011)
 Marlaena Kessick for flute orchestra (2011)
 Fantasia for cello (2011)
 Trio for piano, singer, dancer (2012)
 Fantasia ungherese for flute (2012)
 Trio for violin, cello and double bass (2012)
 Ceneri for piano (2012)
 Così non fan tutte for orchestra (2013)
 Tastiera sola for piano (2013)
 Fibonacci for piano (2013)
 Alhambra for orchestra
 Aus dem klavier for piano
 Chaconne for violin
 Costruzioni for 5 piccole orchestre
 Divertimento for four woodwinds and piano
 Doppio concerto for violin, piano and double chamber orchestra
 Lamento per la morte della madre for piano
 Musica for orchestra
 Quartetto n. 1, n. 2 and n. 3, string quartets
 Riverberazioni for flute, oboe, bassoon and piano

References

External links 

 
 Marcello Abbado (Composer, Arranger) Bach Cantatas Website
 

1926 births
2020 deaths
People of Piedmontese descent
Academic staff of the Conservatorio Giovanni Battista Martini
Italian male composers
Italian male conductors (music)
Italian classical pianists
Male classical pianists
Italian male pianists
Italian music educators
Italian ballet composers
21st-century Italian conductors (music)
21st-century pianists
21st-century Italian male musicians
21st-century Italian composers
20th-century Italian conductors (music)
20th-century pianists
20th-century Italian male musicians
20th-century Italian composers
Musicians from Milan